David Caldwell is a former nose tackle in the National Football League and the Arena Football League.

Biography
Caldwell was born David Anthony Caldwell on February 28, 1965 in Bay City, Texas.

Career
Caldwell played with the Green Bay Packers during the 1987 NFL season. He played at the collegiate level at Texas Christian University. Caldwell re-signed with the Buffalo Destroyers on March 22, 2002.

See also

List of Green Bay Packers players

References

1965 births
People from Bay City, Texas
Green Bay Packers players
San Antonio Force players
Albany Firebirds players
New York CityHawks players
Grand Rapids Rampage players
Houston ThunderBears players
Buffalo Destroyers players
American football defensive tackles
TCU Horned Frogs football players
Living people